Anomiopus parallelus is a species of true dung beetle that can be found in northern Brazil and French Guiana, and can be found in the Amazon and Cerrado biomes. It may be a myrmecophile.

References

parallelus
Beetles described in 1862